The 2020 BYU Cougars men's volleyball team represented Brigham Young University in the 2020 NCAA Division I & II men's volleyball season. The Cougars, led by fifth year head coach Shawn Olmstead, played their home games at Smith Fieldhouse. The Cougars are members of the MPSF and were picked to win the MPSF in the preseason poll. On March 12 the NCAA, BYU, and the MPSF shutdown the remainder of the season due to COVID-19, leaving BYU to end the season ranked #1 and undefeated in conference play.

Season highlights
Will be filled in as the season progresses.

Roster

Schedule
TV/Internet Streaming information:
All home games will be televised on BYUtv. Most road games will also be streamed.

 *-Indicates conference match.
 Times listed are Mountain Time Zone.

Announcers for televised games
Loyola-Chicago: Jason Goch & Ray Gooden
Lewis: No commentary
Penn State: Jarom Jordan & Steve Vail
Penn State: Jarom Jordan & Steve Vail
Mount Olive: Aidan Gilbride & Ethan Swenson
Mount Olive: Aidan Gilbride & Ethan Swenson
UC Irvine: No commentary 
UC Irvine: No commentary
UCSB: Jarom Jordan & Steve Vail
UCSB: Jarom Jordan & Steve Vail
UCLA: Jarom Jordan & Steve Vail
Pepperdine: Jarom Jordan & Steve Vail
Grand Canyon: Kyle Borg & Jack O'Hara
Concordia Irvine: Jarom Jordan & Steve Vail
USC: Jarom Jordan & Steve Vail
Stanford: Jarom Jordan & Steve Vail
Hawai'i: Kanoa Leahey, Chris McLachlin, & Ryan Kalei Tsuji
Hawai'i: Kanoa Leahey, Chris McLachlin, & Ryan Kalei Tsuji

References

2020 in sports in Utah
2020 NCAA Division I & II men's volleyball season
2020 team
2020 Mountain Pacific Sports Federation volleyball season